Ohkay Owingeh Airport  is a public use airport located in Rio Arriba County, New Mexico, United States. It is three nautical miles (6 km) northeast of the central business district of the city of Española. The airport is owned by the Ohkay Owingeh Tribal Council.

The airport was known as the San Juan Pueblo Airport until 2008. The name change occurred due to the San Juan Pueblo returning to its pre-Spanish name in November 2005. The Tewa name Ohkay Owingeh means "place of the strong people".

The airport briefly saw commercial airline service in 1978 when Trans Western Airlines of Utah added Espanola as a stop along a route between Albuquerque and Denver. Other stops were also made at Santa Fe, Taos, and Alamosa.

Facilities and aircraft 
It has two runways: 16/34 is 5,007 by 75 feet (1,526 x 23 m) with an asphalt pavement; 6/24 is 3,100 by 35 feet (945 x 11 m) with a dirt surface. Runway 6/24 is permanently closed and a fence has been built across it. For the 12-month period ending April 8, 2009, the airport had 1,000 general aviation aircraft operations, an average of 83 per month.

References

External links 
 Aerial photo as of 5 October 1997 from USGS The National Map
 

Airports in New Mexico
Transportation in Rio Arriba County, New Mexico
Buildings and structures in Rio Arriba County, New Mexico
Native American airports